Spokane International Airport  is a commercial airport located approximately  west-southwest of downtown Spokane, Washington, United States. It is the primary airport serving the Inland Northwest, which consists of 30 counties and includes areas such as Spokane, the Tri-Cities, both in Eastern Washington, and Coeur d'Alene in North Idaho. The airport's code, GEG, is derived from its former name, Geiger Field, which honored Major Harold Geiger (1884–1927).

As of 2015, Spokane International Airport (GEG) ranks as the 70th-busiest airport in the United States in terms of passenger enplanements. At 4,112,784 total passengers served in 2019, it is the second busiest airport in Washington. GEG is served by six airlines with non-stop service to 15 airports in 13 markets.

It is included in the Federal Aviation Administration (FAA) National Plan of Integrated Airport Systems for 2017–2021, in which it is categorized as a small-hub primary commercial service facility.

History

Known as Sunset Field before 1941, it was purchased from the county by the War Department and renamed Geiger Field (hence the IATA code GEG) after Major Harold Geiger, an Army aviation pioneer who died in a crash in 1927.

During World War II, Geiger Field was a major training base by Second Air Force as a group training airfield for B-17 Flying Fortress heavy bombardment units, with new aircraft being obtained from Boeing near Seattle. It was also used by Air Technical Service Command as an aircraft maintenance and supply depot; Deer Park Airport and Felts Field were auxiliaries.

In 1943, General Hap Arnold established the first formal fire protection training course at Geiger Field, Washington. It was used until 1946.

Geiger Field was served by a rail connection to the Great Northern Railway.

Geiger was closed in late 1945 and turned over to War Assets Administration (WAA), then transferred to Spokane County and developed into a commercial airport. The airport hosted USAF Air Defense Command interceptor units during the Cold War for air defense of Hanford Nuclear Reservation and Grand Coulee Dam. Built in 1942 as the Spokane Air Depot, Fairchild Air Force Base is four miles (7 km) to the west.

It became Spokane's municipal airport in 1946, replacing Felts Field, and received its present name in 1960, after the City of Spokane was allotted Spokane Geiger Field by the Surplus Property Act and Air Canada started service to Calgary. In November 1972, the 4702d Defense Wing moved to the airfield. It was still used by the Air Force into the early 1960s, with the 84th Fighter Group operating Convair F-106 Delta Dart interceptors. The airport code is still GEG, for Geiger Field.

The current Concourse A and B complex opened in 1965 and was designed by Warren C. Heylman and William Trogdon.

Occasional non-stop flights to southern California since the 1970s have been among the first to be suspended during economic downturns.

Expansion from the 1970s

A second level was added to Concourse A and Concourse B in 1974.

The airport has a Master Plan, which includes a third runway and gates added to Concourse C.

A new control tower has been built south of the airport, replacing the one near Concourse C. The new control tower is the tallest one in the State.  The Terminal, Rotunda, and Concourse C Enhancement Project (TRACE) was recently completed, designed by Bernardo/Wills Architects, P.C. The project, which concluded in November 2006, added retail space and expanded security checkpoints in the airport's three concourses, and gave the Rotunda an aesthetic renovation. In 2010, 2000 feet was added to Runway 3–21 and parallel taxiways 'A' and 'G', enabling heavier aircraft departures in summer months.

By 2023, the airport plans to add new gates, centralized security and expanded baggage claim space as it looks to add more direct flights, including to the east coast, to capitalize on and accommodate growing passenger and cargo traffic; the Spokane market has been hosting big events and attracting business to the area.

Facilities

Airfield

Runway 3/21: , asphalt/concrete
Runway 8/26: , asphalt

Tower

It is believed that the tower is the only federal air traffic control tower named for any single person. That honor was bestowed in 2010 on Ray Daves, the World War II radioman who survived Pearl Harbor and Midway and went on to serve as an air traffic controller in Spokane after the war until the 1970s.

Terminals

The passenger terminal facility at Spokane International Airport has three main structures; Concourse A and B in the center, Concourse C to the southwest, and the Ground Transportation Center to the north. The three structures are immediately adjacent and connected, however the two concourse structures are not linked with an airside connector on the sterile side; as such, connecting passengers need to transit between Concourse A-B and Concourse C through the landside, non-sterile circulation.

Concourse A-B

The 1965 Concourse A-B complex includes the two concourses linked by a central rotunda area with dining and shopping vendors. The  rotunda is supported entirely along its perimeter and features no obstructions. Concourse A houses 5 gates (11-15), while Concourse B houses 8 gates (1–8).

The Concourse A-B complex originally opened on April 1, 1965, and was designed by Warren C. Heylman and William Trogdon. The new terminal cost a reported  and was dedicated on May 8, 1965, in a ceremony attended by Senator Warren Magnuson and Civil Aeronautics Board chair Alan Boyd. Designed in the Neo-Expressionism style, the building's architecture prominently features exposed concrete as well as distinct sculpted and monolithic architectural shapes and forms.

As the airport has continued to incrementally expand, some of the original architectural intent of the Concourse A-B complex has been lost. While several expansions to the concourse extended the building's original architectural style, other additions have altered it. In 1974, a second floor was added to both Concourses A and B to allow for the implementation of passenger boarding bridge access to aircraft. The new floors, while sharing some material commonality with the original Heylman and Trogdon concourse, lacked the same curvy and sculpted neo-expressionistic forms. The later additions of the ground transportation facility and Concourse C to the ends of the concourse building further altered the architecture by replacing its distinct bookend elevations and entrances with corridors to the adjacent buildings. Interior renovations in the mid-2000s also replaced many of Concourse A-B complex's original sculpted forms and monolithic materials with more rectilinear forms and contemporary finish materials. Despite this, many of the original architectural elements remain integral to the space (such as the exposed concrete roof trusses and concrete columns), creating a juxtaposition between the newer elements and the original architecture.

Under the proposed Terminal Renovation and Expansion (TREX) program to accommodate projected growth, the separate baggage claim areas in Concourse A-B and Concourse C would be consolidated into a single baggage claim with five carousels, and A-B would receive a renovation. Ultimately, operations at A-B would wind down under long-term plans to construct a new terminal in 2030, at the earliest.

Southwest Airlines is the current primary occupant operating in and out of Concourse A. Delta and United Airlines both operate in and out of Concourse B. American Airlines operated in and out of Concourse B before relocating to Concourse C in March 2016.

Concourse C

Concourse C houses 9 gates, both upper (30-32) and lower (21a, 21b, 22-26). The lower level gates house regional turboprop aircraft, while the upper-level gates house narrow-body aircraft. The current iteration of Concourse C opened in 2000 after a $20 million redevelopment and expansion project, designed by Bernardo-Wills Architects.  The project, which broke ground in 1998 added  to the concourse including a new baggage claim and two-story passenger facility. The  concourse was remodeled into service and operations functions. The new Concourse C has a more contemporary architectural style, contrasting the appearance of the Concourse A and B complex, by employing a large use of metal cladding and large curtain window walls on its exterior building envelope. However, it draws inspiration from its neo-expressionist neighbor by architecturally expressing a modular, repetitive, and exposed structural grid through its façade and interior lobby areas.

Alaska Airlines and its subsidiary carrier Horizon Air were the primary occupants operating in and out of Concourse C after Frontier Airlines ceased operations to Spokane in January 2015. However, that changed once American Airlines relocated to Concourse C in March 2016. Alaska and American operate in and out of the upper-level gates, while Horizon operates in and out of the lower level gates.

Airlines and destinations
Spokane International Airport is served by six main carriers. These carriers serve 13 markets through non-stop service to 17 airports. In December 2021, WestJet announced that it submitted an application to the FAA to fly to Calgary and Vancouver from Spokane using Saab 340 turboprop aircraft operated by Pacific Coastal Airlines.

Passenger

Cargo

Statistics

Top destinations

Airline market share

Annual traffic
Annual passenger traffic as reported by the Spokane International Airport (GEG).

Ground transportation
Spokane Transit operates four stops at Spokane International Airport, with bus routes 60 and 63. The airport is also served by the WSDOT's Travel Washington Gold Line, Northwestern Trailways, Wheatland Express, Queen City Shuttle, and Special Mobility Service.

A consolidated rental car facility is located adjacent to the Ground Transportation Center on the north end of the main terminal.  The consolidated facility opened in November 2008, replacing several satellite operations, and is intended to meet passenger growth at the airport for 20 years after its opening.

Accidents and incidents
Six months later on September 14, 1961, a USAF F-106 crashed on approach to Geiger Field, killing its pilot.
Two passengers and two crew were aboard, and all survived with minor injuries. The pilot walked from the crash site to a nearby service station to report it. Due to fog, the flight had stopped in Pasco rather than Walla Walla.
 On January 20, 1981, a Beechcraft Model 99A, Cascade Airways Flight 201, crashed into a hill  from the runway. The accident was caused by an incorrect distance measuring equipment frequency and premature descent to minimum descent altitude. Of the nine on board, seven were killed (including both pilots), and the surviving two passengers were seriously injured. The airline ceased operations about five years later.
On March 18, 1994, a Douglas DC-3C of Salair crashed shortly after take-off on a cargo flight to Portland, killing both pilots. The starboard engine failed shortly after take-off; it had previously been in long-term storage and had been overhauled the previous year and fitted to the aircraft on February 21, replacing an engine that developed a misfire and loss of power. It had accumulated 15 hours flight time at the time of the accident. The aircraft was destroyed in the subsequent fire.
On January 4, 1996, a Convair CV-440, operated by Salair on a positioning flight, lost power in both engines at 500 feet on an ILS approach to runway 3 due to fuel starvation and false fuel readings and darkness. The plane performed a forced landing, struck a berm in a field and was substantially damaged. Both occupants survived, but the aircraft was written off.

See also

 Washington World War II Army Airfields
 Western Air Defense Force (Air Defense Command)
 9th Air Division

References

Air Force & DOD Fire Academy History

External links

 Spokane International Airport, official site
 Spokane International Airport at WSDOT Aviation
 
 

Airports established in 1940
Airfields of the United States Army Air Corps
Airfields of the United States Army Air Forces in Washington (state)
Airports in Washington (state)
Transportation buildings and structures in Spokane County, Washington
Transportation in Spokane, Washington
1940 establishments in Washington (state)